Mount Murchison is a mountain in the Southern Alps in the Canterbury region of New Zealand. It is the highest point of the Shaler Range, which runs approximately north–south to the east of the Wilberforce River.
A col to the east of the peak separates two glaciers, the Kahutea Glacier to the south and the White Glacier to the Northeast.

References

Mountains of Canterbury, New Zealand
Southern Alps